Through the Dark may refer to:

Films
 Through the Dark (1924 film), an American silent film directed by George W. Hill
 Through the Dark (2016 film), an interactive film directed by Mike Daly

Music
 "Through the Dark", a song by British singer songwriter Alexi Murdoch, from his 2011 album Towards the Sun
 "Through the Dark", a song by British-Irish boy band One Direction, from their album Midnight Memories
 "Through the Dark", a song by Australian hip hop group Hilltop Hoods, from their album Walking Under Stars

See also
 Through the Darkness (disambiguation)